The Serra da Concórdia State Park  is a state park in the state of Rio de Janeiro, Brazil.
It protects an area of Atlantic Forest.

Location

The Serra da Concórdia State Park is divided between the municipalities of Valença and Barra do Piraí, Rio de Janeiro.
The park has a temporary seat on the Estrada da Concórdia in Valença.

The park is in the Paraíba do Sul river basin, in the middle Paraíba region.
It preserves one of the last remnants of seasonal semi-deciduous forest of the middle Paraíba valley.

History

The Serra da Concórdia State Park was created by state decree 32.577 of 30 December 2002.
The objective is to preserve remnants of Atlantic Forest, including rare, endemic or endangered species of native fauna and flora, to integrate ecological corridors that can ensure regional biodiversity, to protect the region's water resources and to support recreation, environmental education and scientific research.

The park was enlarged by decree 45.766 of 28 September 2016.

Visiting

The park is open from 8:00 to 17:00 Monday to Friday.
Activities include low-intensity trails, canoeing and rock climbing.
Visitors may engage in other outdoor activities that do not disturb the natural environment.
Visitors should stay on the trails, respect fauna and flora, make no changes to the environment and remove all garbage.
Hunting, capturing animals, taking plants and making campfires are prohibited.

Notes

Sources

State parks of Brazil
Protected areas established in 2002
2002 establishments in Brazil
Protected areas of Rio de Janeiro (state)